Michael Rae (born 13 June 1995) is a New Zealand first-class cricketer who plays for Otago. He made his List A debut for New Zealand XI against Pakistan on 3 January 2018.

He was the joint-leading wicket-taker in the 2017–18 Plunket Shield season for Otago, with 29 dismissals in ten matches. In June 2018, he was awarded a contract with Otago for the 2018–19 season. In June 2020, he was offered a contract by Otago ahead of the 2020–21 domestic cricket season. In November 2020, Rae was named in the New Zealand A cricket team for practice matches against the touring West Indies team.

On 6 December 2020, in the third round of the 2020–21 Ford Trophy, Rae took the third-best figures in a domestic List A match in New Zealand, with 7 for 35 from his 10 overs. In March 2021, in the 2020–21 Plunket Shield season, Rae took a hat-trick against Central Districts.

See also
 List of Otago representative cricketers

References

External links
 

1995 births
Living people
New Zealand cricketers
Otago cricketers
Cricketers from Dunedin